Bazar-Korgon is a town in Jalal-Abad Region of Kyrgyzstan. Formerly a large village, it was established as a city in January 2021 from the former rural community (ayyl aymagy) of Bazar-Korgon (villages Bazar-Korgon, Besh-Badam, Jeti-Koshkon and Kök-Alma) and part of the rural community Kengesh (villages Sovet, Auk, Kyzyl and Orto-Say). Its population was 41,011 in 2021. The majority of its inhabitants are ethnic Uzbek (approximately 80 percent) and the remaining 20% are predominantly ethnic Kyrgyzs. The town has a large open air market. Shared taxis to the regional capital Jalal-Abad depart every 15 to 20 minutes.

Population

See also 
Azimzhan Askarov

References 

Populated places in Jalal-Abad Region